The 44th Superflo 12 Hours of Sebring presented by Aurora was an endurance racing sports car event held at Sebring International Raceway from March 13–16, 1996. The race served as the second round of the 1996 IMSA GT Championship.

Race results
Class winners in bold.

External links
 Race Results
 Car Information

12 Hours of Sebring
12 Hours of Sebring
Sebring
12 Hours of Sebring
12 Hours of Sebring